UTC−04:00 is an identifier for a time offset from UTC of −04:00.

It is observed in the Eastern Time Zone (e.g., Canada and the United States) during the warm months of daylight saving time, as Eastern Daylight Time. The Atlantic Time Zone observes it during standard time (cold months).

It is observed all year in the Eastern Caribbean and several South American countries.

As standard time (Northern Hemisphere winter)
Principal cities: Halifax, Hamilton

North America
Canada – Atlantic Time Zone
New Brunswick
Newfoundland and Labrador
Labrador
Except the area between L'Anse-au-Clair and Norman Bay
Nova Scotia
Prince Edward Island
Denmark
Greenland
Pituffik (Thule) (former settlement), Qaanaaq (present settlement)
United Kingdom
Bermuda

As daylight saving time (Northern Hemisphere summer)
Principal cities: New York, Washington, Philadelphia, Boston, Miami, Ottawa, Toronto, Montreal, Havana, Nassau, Port-au-Prince, Cockburn Town, Providenciales

North America
Canada (Eastern Time Zone)
Nunavut
Qikiqtaaluk Region except Resolute
Ontario
East of 90° West longitude
Quebec
Most of province except easternmost part of Côte-Nord
United States (Eastern Time Zone)
Delaware
District of Columbia
Florida
Entire state except the counties of Bay, Calhoun, Escambia, Holmes, Jackson, Okaloosa, Santa Rosa, Walton, and Washington, and northern Gulf county (panhandle)
Georgia
Indiana
Except the northwestern counties of Jasper, Lake, LaPorte, Newton, Porter and Starke, and the southwestern counties of Gibson, Perry, Posey, Spencer, Vanderburgh and Warrick
Kentucky
Counties to the east of the counties of Breckinridge, Grayson, Hart, Green, Adair, Russell and Clinton
Maryland
Michigan
Except the western counties of Dickinson, Gogebic, Iron and Menominee
New England (states of Connecticut, Massachusetts, Maine, New Hampshire, Rhode Island and Vermont)
New Jersey
New York
North Carolina
Ohio
Pennsylvania
South Carolina
Tennessee
The counties of Scott, Morgan, Roane, Rhea, Meigs and Bradley, and all counties to the east of these
Virginia
West Virginia

Caribbean
Bahamas
Cuba
Haiti
United Kingdom
Turks and Caicos Islands

As standard time (year-round)
Principal cities: Caracas, Manaus, Santo Domingo, La Paz, Georgetown, Santa Cruz de la Sierra, St. John's, Bridgetown, Roseau, Santo Domingo, Gustavia, St. George's, The Bottom, Oranjestad, Philipsburg, Lower Prince's Quarter, Basseterre, Castries, Kingstown, Port of Spain, San Fernando, The Valley, Road Town, Plymouth, Brades, Little Bay, San Juan, Charlotte Amalie, Oranjestad, Kralendijk, Willemstad, Pointe-à-Pitre, Les Abymes, Fort-de-France, Maracaibo

South America
Bolivia
Brazil
The states of Amazonas (except westernmost municipalities), Mato Grosso, Mato Grosso do Sul, Rondônia and Roraima)
Guyana
Venezuela

Eastern Caribbean
Antigua and Barbuda
Barbados
Dominica
Dominican Republic
France
Guadeloupe 
Basse-Terre 
Grande-Terre
Les Saintes 
Marie-Galante
La Désirade
Martinique
Saint Barthélemy
Saint Martin
Grenada
Carriacou and Petite Martinique
Netherlands
Saba
Sint Eustatius
Sint Maarten
Saint Kitts and Nevis
Saint Kitts
Nevis
Saint Lucia
Saint Vincent and the Grenadines
Saint Vincent
The Grenadines
Trinidad and Tobago
Tobago
Trinidad
United Kingdom
Anguilla
British Virgin Islands
Tortola
Virgin Gorda
Anegada
Jost Van Dyke
Montserrat

US territories

United States
Puerto Rico
Spanish Virgin Islands
United States Virgin Islands
Saint Croix
Saint Thomas
Saint John
Water Island

Other Caribbean
Netherlands
Aruba
Bonaire
Curaçao

North America
Canada – Atlantic Time Zone
Quebec
East of the 63°W longitude
Prince Edward Island

Antarctica

Southern Ocean
Some bases in Antarctica. See also Time in Antarctica
Brazil
Comandante Ferraz Antarctic Station
Russia
Bellingshausen Station

As standard time (Southern Hemisphere winter)
Principal cities: Santiago, Asunción

South America
Chile (except Easter Island and Magallanes/Antarctic)
Paraguay

Antarctica
Some bases in Antarctica. See also Time in Antarctica

See also
UTC−05:00
UTC−03:00
Time in Argentina
Time in Brazil
Time in Canada
Time in Chile
Time in Denmark
Time in Mexico
Time in Paraguay
Time in the United States
Time in Trinidad and Tobago
Time in Uruguay
Time in Venezuela

References

External links

UTC offsets